"Kran Turismo" is a song by a Finnish rap duo JVG. The song features an appearance by a reggae artist Raappana. The song serves as the second single from JVG's second album jvg.fi. The song spent 12 weeks at number one on the Finnish Singles Chart. A music video was uploaded to YouTube in July 2012. According to IFPI Finland, the single sold 3,187 copies in 2012.

Chart performance

References

2012 singles
Finnish-language songs
Number-one singles in Finland
2012 songs